Peter V served as Greek Patriarch of Alexandria sometime between the 7th and 8th centuries (exact dates are not known).

References

7th-century Patriarchs of Alexandria